S* (pronounced "S Star") is the diminutive for the S* Life Science Informatics Alliance, a collaboration between seven universities and the Karolinska Institutet of Sweden, and its course, the S-Star Bioinformatics Online course. The goal is to provide course material for training in bioinformatics and genomics.

Member institutions 
The following institutions are members of the S* Life Science Informatics Alliance:
 Macquarie University, Sydney, Australia
 University of Sydney (School of Molecular Bioscience), Australia (as of 2001)
 Karolinska Institutet, Sweden (as of 2001)
 University of Uppsala, Sweden (as of 2001)
 National University of Singapore, Singapore (as of 2001)
 University of the Western Cape, South Africa (as of 2001)
 Stanford University, United States (as of 2001)
 University of California, San Diego, United States, via the San Diego Supercomputer Center (as of 2002)

References

Further reading
 
 https://www.learntechlib.org/p/100842

Bioinformatics organizations